The Warsaw Formation is a geologic formation in Illinois, Iowa and Missouri. It preserves fossils dating back to the Mississippian subperiod.

See also

 List of fossiliferous stratigraphic units in Illinois
 List of fossiliferous stratigraphic units in Iowa
 List of fossiliferous stratigraphic units in Missouri

References

 

Carboniferous Illinois
Carboniferous Iowa
Mississippian Missouri
Carboniferous southern paleotropical deposits